Pease Park (officially Pease District Park) is an urban park in central Austin, Texas. Paralleling Shoal Creek west of downtown, the park is frequented by University of Texas at Austin and Long-View Micro School students and, formerly, by disc golf enthusiasts. Every spring it plays host to the annual Eeyore's Birthday Party celebration, a favorite event for Austin's hippie subculture dating back to the 1960s.

History
The parcel of land that is now Pease Park was named after and donated to the city of Austin by Texas Governor Elisha M. Pease and his wife in 1875. The land remained undeveloped until the city and civic organizations cooperated to beautify the park in 1926, building entrance gates, restrooms, and other amenities. Further improvements were made later, including the installation of a group of long concrete picnic tables by the Civilian Conservation Corps in the 1930s and the construction of a hike-and-bike trail connecting the park to the city's larger trail network in the 1950s.

On October 16, 2019  ground broke on the US$15 million dollar 10 acres Kingsbury Commons, the most significant upgrade to Pease Park in a century, as part of a larger Master Plan. Construction concluded in June 2021.

Eeyore's Birthday Party

Since 1974 Pease Park has hosted Austin's annual Eeyore's Birthday Party event, with music, costumes, games and drum circles. The event is typically attended by thousands, filling the park with activities.

Disc golf course
Pease Park was the site of a popular disc golf course running along Shoal Creek. On January 1, 2011, the park's disc golf course was closed indefinitely due to environmental impact problems.

References

External links

Park Profile at Austin Parks Foundation
UrbanGrounds: Pease Park Disc Golf (with map of the course)
Pease Park on Centxdglove.com (with pictures of each hole)

Parks in Austin, Texas
Urban public parks